Jevremovac is a town in the municipality of Šabac, Serbia. According to the 2002 census, the town has a population of 3310 people.

References

Populated places in Mačva District